Scott Scurlock (March 5, 1955 – November 28, 1996) born William Scott Scurlock in Fairfax County, Virginia was the son of a minister. He was nicknamed the Hollywood Bandit (or simply Hollywood).  He got this nickname from his involvement in bank robberies in the Seattle area during the 1990s during which he used acting makeup and disguises. Using Hollywood quality make-up he successfully robbed 17 banks. His last attempt ended in a police shootout with Scurlock escaping the scene. His two accomplices were captured and one gave Scurlock up. He eventually shot himself in the head as FBI agents waited outside a trailer he was holed up in and called out to him to surrender.

1970s and 1980s 

In 1974, Scurlock moved to Hawaii from Virginia and reunited with his friend Kevin Meyers, who went to the University of Hawaii on a full pole-vault scholarship.  After Meyers's pole vault scholarship ended, Meyers and Scurlock moved to the North Shore of Oahu, and lived on a five-acre tomato farm. They worked in Honolulu for a company called Hawaii Plant Life and Privacy Fences four days a week and the rest they spent out on the North Shore. In 1976, while hiking, Scurlock and Meyers came across a small marijuana farm.  Scurlock and Meyers went back and took a number of marijuana plants which Scott subsequently sold.  Scurlock hadn't planned on being involved in the drug trade after that but, liking the easy money he made, planted his own marijuana plants hidden on the tomato farm.  When their landlord at the tomato farm found out, Scott was kicked off the property and Meyers moved to Banff National Park, Canada soon thereafter. Scurlock left Hawaii and moved to Olympia, Washington.  

In 1978, Scott enrolled at Evergreen State College dreaming of becoming a doctor.  He excelled in college, including chemistry classes.  As a result, Scurlock began sneaking into the school chemistry lab at night through the ceilings to make methamphetamines, which he subsequently sold.  With the money he made by dealing meth, he was able to buy twenty acres of secluded land near Olympia that had a small house on it.  He used the house for meth production and built a three-story treehouse on the property. Scott bragged that he and others built the tree house in only two weeks, working day and night "due to being high on meth." The treehouse included an extra-large fireplace, outdoor bathtub, and an emergency escape using rope lines to zip through the woods.  

Scurlock, who bore a striking resemblance to Mel Gibson, was popular with friends that he referred to as "his tribe," who would do almost anything for him. Scurlock hired Steve Meyers — Kevin's brother, a successful sculptor who was struggling after a bitter divorce — to come to Washington and do work on his treehouse. Steve Meyers transformed it and said that when he arrived, "there was nothing in the house that was conscientiously designed, that's very much what Scott was like ..."  Scurlock had an open and free demeanor and is videotaped extensively in the buff. He traveled extensively, had no shortage of girlfriends, and enjoyed the finest restaurants and champagne; he was known by local waitresses to always leave a $100 tip.  

Scurlock dropped out of school due to the money the drug business was making for him.  That ended in 1989 when Scurlock's main distributor was murdered.  As a result, Scurlock decided that the drug business was too dangerous and quit immediately.  When asked by a friend about his (Scurlock's) biggest priority being money, he replied, "No, no. All that does is let you live life a little easier."  However, Scurlock had to have an income so he needed to come up with another solution.

Bank robbery 

According to Steve Meyers, Scurlock had told him that he always had dreams, even as a child, of robbing banks, in a Robin Hood type of fashion kind of like re-appropriating money. It was with this kind of mindset that Scurlock looked up someone that he trusted, an old college friend named Mark Biggins. Biggins was having severe financial problems and was trying to support a family.  Scurlock had previously hired Biggins to work on his property to help Biggins financially. As a result, when Scurlock asked Biggins to rob banks with him, Biggins felt obligated.  

On June 25, 1992, Scurlock and Biggins robbed their first bank. It didn't go well. The duo had planned to take a car from someone in the bank as their get-away vehicle, which they did, but Biggins was so nervous that he flooded the engine. They then had to run on foot encountering vicious dogs and running across a golf course where they left confused golfers and witnesses. After the fiasco, Biggins didn't want to be involved with bank robbery and "quit."  However, Scurlock loved the adrenaline rush and continued to rob banks on his own. He asked his friend Kevin Meyers to help and offered him $250,000 for one job. Meyers declined knowing it would only corrupt his goal to become an artist.  

In 1992, Scurlock robbed six banks, leaving few or no clues for the FBI, who subsequently gave him the pseudonym "Hollywood" for his theatrical make-up worn during the robberies. Scurlock had plenty of banks to choose from, all with plenty of cash due to the growing high tech industries in the Seattle, Washington area which turned the locale into a money pit.  

In 1993, Steve Meyers became a look-out for Scurlock. Meyers monitored a police scanner, and when any 911 calls came in about the robbery, he would call Scurlock out of the bank.  The duo used many tricks to throw off police and even paid off bank employees to find out information that would aid them in the robberies. Scurlock convinced Mark Biggins to forget the first bank-robbing debacle and help him and Steve with the robberies.  Biggins became an in-bank lookout watching Scurlock's back.  Steve, on 48 Hours, praised Scurlock for his professional approach, saying, "His whole point was if you go in crazy with violence and waving a gun and something does happen, what do you do then? Most people working in banks realize that this guy is not afraid.  That is more frightening and commanding without having to be crazy."  Meyers also said that they robbed two of the banks three times each.  Due to Scurlock's knowledge of police work, police were concerned that it could be a police officer committing the robberies.  

By the end of 1995, Scurlock had stolen almost one million dollars. The FBI did notice a pattern and figured that Scurlock needed about $20,000 per month. They were able to determine this by noticing the pattern of his robberies, which seemed to be based around how much money he absconded within any given robbery.  With this information, they were able to determine when he would rob the next bank and made an educated guess as to which bank it would be.  Their guess on the date, January 25, 1996, was exact but they surveilled a bank that was about two miles away from the actual bank he robbed and didn't arrive at the robbery scene in time.  

By mid-1996, Scurlock, with Biggins and Meyers, had robbed two more banks. That came to 17 banks in four years. The FBI put a $50,000 reward on the capture of the robber, thinking at the time that there was only one person involved. The reward signs showed a sketch of the robber that looked nothing like Scurlock.

His weapon of choice was a Glock 17 Generation 1 9mm pistol which he used in each of the hold up robberies and the pistol he shot himself with.

Death 

On the final bank robbery attempt, the threesome, emboldened by the reward on Scurlock, planned on robbing five banks on the same night. According to Steve Meyers, they even had a "mobile base station set up to white out the police frequencies."  But after learning that the police had convinced every bank in Seattle to put electronic tracers in with any stolen money, they scaled back the plans and decided to rob just one bank.  On a rainy dark Thanksgiving eve, 1996, at around 5:30 pm they hit the Seafirst Bank, which they learned was going to have $3–$4 million on hand that day.  They escaped in one car and changed to a white van to throw off police.  They then started digging frantically through the money looking for the electronic tracers. 

At the same time, they became stuck in Thanksgiving holiday rush hour traffic.  At that point, police say that they spotted a van in which there was a flashlight going back and forth. The police (FBI Supervisory Special Agent Ellen Glasser, Seattle Police Detective Mike Magan, Mercer Island Detective Pete Erickson, Seattle Police Officers Tom Mahaffey, Curt Gerry, and Michael Thomas), in a number of vehicles, then surrounded the van, which had turned onto a side street and stopped. Police claimed that Steve Meyers got out of the van with a rifle and began shooting at them, but Steve Meyers said that he never got out of the van and that police fired on them first. Meyers says that he and Biggins were shot in the arms as a result and were immobilized.  Scurlock, who was driving, was the one who got out of the van, intending to fire in self-defense but his rifle jammed. He then got back in the van and took off. A severely injured Biggins returned 37 rounds at the police.  Two hundred police officers eventually responded to the scene. Scurlock jumped out of the van and fired three rounds from a shotgun at police. The van then took off again but crashed into the side of a house. Biggins and Meyers were found in the van with more than $1 million spread out over the floor of the van in addition to weapons, makeup, clothing, and blood.  But Scurlock wasn't there.  He had escaped the scene without being noticed by police when he jumped out before the van took off for the last time.  Police searched the area thoroughly but were unable to find Scurlock. 

The next day, Thanksgiving, Wilma Walker and her sons, Robert and Ronald Walker, were getting ready for Thanksgiving dinner.  Just for peace of mind, her son Ronald decided to check their camper in the back of their house.  A few minutes later, Ronald came into the house saying, "I saw him, I saw him! He has black curly hair!" according to Wilma. They then called the police.  Five officers (Sgt. Howard Monta, Officers Joe Dittoe, Mike Cruzan, Jim Johnson, Jr, and Sjon Stevens) showed up. One knocked on the door of the camper and identified themselves. There was no response. The police sprayed two full canisters of pepper spray into the camper. They still heard nothing. Police were convinced that no one was in the camper but to satisfy the Walker family, Sgt. Howard Monta went over to take one more look. He had begun to look into the camper with his flashlight when a gunshot went off. Monta thought he had been shot. The other two officers opened fire on the camper. More officers responded. Approximately four hours passed with nothing happening and then police fired tear gas into the camper before making an entry. Police entered the camper and found Scurlock dead from a self-inflicted gun wound. The gunshot that Sgt. Monta had heard was actually Scurlock shooting himself.

The number of robberies, 18 in total, and the amounts stolen, almost $2.3 million, make Scurlock one of the most prolific bank robbers in the history of the United States. Steven Paul Meyers (born February 22, 1950) and Mark John Biggins (born June 1, 1954), were each sentenced to 21 years' imprisonment. Meyers was released in 2013 and living in New Iberia, Louisiana while Biggins was released in 2015 and living in Olympia, Washington.

In popular culture 
Scurlock’s robberies were featured in an episode of Masterminds.

Scurlock’s robberies were featured in an episode of The FBI Files.

References

External links
 CBS NEWS: The End Of The Dream: Part 1
 CBS NEWS: A Modern-Day Robin Hood: Part 2
 CBS NEWS: The Dream Unravels: Part 3
 SEATTLE TIMES: Scurlock: Known For Looks, Charm And His Big Tips -- 4-Year String Of Robberies Shocks Friends

American bank robbers
1955 births
1996 deaths
Suicides by firearm in Washington (state)